Gerardo Jáuregui (born 25 May 1942) is an Argentine equestrian. He competed in two events at the 1972 Summer Olympics.

References

External links
 

1942 births
Living people
Argentine male equestrians
Olympic equestrians of Argentina
Equestrians at the 1972 Summer Olympics
Place of birth missing (living people)